There are at least 2109 species of dicotyledons found in Montana according to the Montana Field Guide.   This is a list of Dicotyledoneae orders found in Montana. The Montana Natural Heritage Program has identified a number of dicot species as "Species of Concern". Some of these species are exotics (not native to Montana).

 List of Asterales of Montana (Order Asterales)
 List of Ranunculales of Montana (Order Ranunculales)
 List of Rubiales of Montana (Order Rubiales)
 List of Campanulales of Montana (Order Campanulales)
 List of Fagales of Montana (Order Fagales)
 List of Lamiales of Montana (Order Lamiales)
 List of Rhamnales of Montana (Order Rhamnales)
 List of Polygonales of Montana (Order Polygonales)
 List of Capparales of Montana (Order Capparales)
 List of Caryophyllales of Montana (Order Caryophyllales)
 Celastrales (Order Celastrales)
Celastrus scandens, bittersweet
Paxistima myrsinites, mountain-lover or Oregon boxleaf
 List of Dipsacales of Montana (Order Dipsacales)
 List of Gentianales of Montana (Order Gentianales)
 Dogwood (Order Cornales)
Cornus canadensis, Bunchberry dogwood
Cornus sericea, Red-osier dogwood
 List of Santalales of Montana (Order Santalales)
 List of Myrtales of Montana (Order Myrtales)
 Flax (Order Linales)
Linum australe, southern flax
Linum lewisii, prairie flax
Linum rigidum, stiff-stem flax
Linum rigidum var. compactum, Wyoming flax
Linum rigidum var. rigidum, stiff-stem flax
Linum usitatissimum, common flax
 List of Papaverales of Montana (Order Papaverales)
 List of Geraniales of Montana (Order Geraniales)
 Ginger (Order Aristolochiales)
Asarum caudatum, wild ginger
 List of Apiales of Montana (Order Apiales)
 List of Ericales of Montana (Order Ericales)
 List of Malvales of Montana (Order Malvales)
 List of Sapindales of Montana (Order Sapindales)
 Milkworts (Order Polygalales)
Polygala alba, white milkwort
Polygala verticillata, whorled milkwort
 Oleasters (Order Proteales)
Elaeagnus angustifolia, Russian olive
Elaeagnus commutata, American silverberry
Shepherdia argentea, silver buffaloberry
Shepherdia canadensis, Canada buffaloberry
 List of Fabales of Montana (Order Fabales)
 Peony (Order Dilleniales)
Paeonia brownii, western peony
 List of Plantaginales of Montana (Order Plantaginales)
 List of Primulales of Montana (Order Primulales)
 List of Rosales of Montana (Order Rosales)
 List of Scrophulariales of Montana (Order Scrophulariales)
 List of Solanales of Montana (Order Solanales)
 List of Euphorbiales of Montana (Order Euphorbiales)
 List of Theales of Montana (Order Theales)
 Sundews (Order Nepenthales)
Drosera anglica, English sundew
Drosera linearis, linear-leaved sundew
Drosera rotundifolia, roundleaf sundew
 List of Urticales of Montana (Order Urticales)
 List of Violales of Montana (Order Violales)
 Water milfoil (Order Haloragales)
Myriophyllum quitense, Andean water-milfoil
Myriophyllum sibiricum, common water-milfoil
Myriophyllum spicatum, Eurasian water-milfoil
Myriophyllum verticillatum, whorled water-milfoil
 List of Nymphaeales of Montana (Order Nymphaeales)
 Water-starworts and mare's-tails (Order Callitrichales)
 Mare's tails, Family: Hippuridaceae
Hippuris vulgaris, common mare's-tail
 Water-starworts, Family: Callitrichaceae 
Callitriche hermaphroditica, autumnal water-starwort
Callitriche heterophylla, large water-starwort
Callitriche palustris, vernal water starwort
Callitriche stagnalis, pond water-starwort
 List of Salicales of Montana (Order Salicales)

Further reading

See also
 List of monocotyledons of Montana
 List of coniferous plants of Montana
 List of lichens of Montana

Notes

Dicotyl